Max Mirnyi and Andrei Olhovskiy were the defending champions, but none competed this year. Mirnyi played in Delray Beach at the same week

Martin Damm and David Prinosil won the title by defeating Jonas Björkman and Sébastien Lareau 6–1, 5–7, 7–5 in the final.

Seeds
A champion seed is indicated in bold text while text in italics indicates the round in which that seed was eliminated.

Draw

Draw

References
 Official Results Archive (ATP)
 Official Results Archive (ITF)

2000 Copenhagen Open – 2
2000 ATP Tour